Bidhwan is a village and administrative unit with a democratically elected panchayat samiti (local council) in the Loharu (Vidhan Sabha constituency), Siwani Tehsil of Bhiwani District under Bhiwani-Mahendragarh Lok Sabha constituency and Hisar Division of Haryana state.

History

Bidhwan Jaglan Zail and Jaglan Lambardari

Bidhwan is the seat of former "Jaglan Zail" headed by the Zaildar from the influential Jaglan clan, who during the British Raj, ruled over four revenue villages near Princely state of Loharu State, namely Bidhwan, Kalali (कलाली), Mandholi Khurd  (मंढोली खुर्द) and Mandholi Kalan (मंढोलीकलां). Currently, these villages lie in the Bhiwani district. Descendants of the Jaglan clan still live in the village and they currently holds the position of Lambardar of Bidhwan village.

Nearby archaeological sites
Nearby Indus Valley civilization archaeological sites are Banawali, Lohari Ragho, Masudpur, Rakhigarhi, Siswal all with Hissar district as well as Burj and Bhirrana and Kunal and Balu in Fatehabad and Mitathal and Naurangabad in Bhiwani district. Other archaeological site are Agroha Mound where the original pillar of Ashoka was taken to Firoz Shah Palace Complex in Hisar.
Goldy Jaglan

Administration
Currently, Bidhwan is under Bhiwani Zilla Panchayat and has its own unreserved Gram Panchayat under Gram Panchayat Smiti code 244115 and 2011 census village code 061301 and village name Bidhwan (113). As of August 2013, Ravinder Kumar is the Sarpanch of the Gram Panchayat Smiti.
There is a Patwari (government land record officer), an ADO (Agriculture Development Officer),a Rural Health Officer (RHO), and an Anganbadi Worker based at Bidhwan.

Government schemes
Bidhwan is covered by the Pradhan Mantri Awas Yojana, Deen Dayal Upadhyaya Gram Jyoti Yojana rural electrification scheme, and National Rural Employment Guarantee scheme.

Demographics

As per a 20101 census, Bidhwan had 45% literacy rate (2016 out of 4500 residents) and 1890 cell-phone connections.

Jat gotras
The following Jat gotras are  found in the village

 Khichar     
 Beniwal 
 Bisla       
 Chahar      
 Ghanghas      
 Jaglan 
 Malik(jadiya)      
 Baloda     
 Kulriya      
 Nehra            
 Poonia
 Repswal
 Saharan
 Sheoran         
 Sura

Other gotras

Baniya: Goyal 
Brahman: Bhardwaj 
Harijan: Nimal 
Khati: Jangra

Education
There is Government High School, Bidhwan. There are many more schools institutes and 3 universities at Hisar (60 km) and Bhiwani (53 km).

Transportation
Bidhwan is well connected by the paved bitumen road. It lies from 7 km Jhumpa Khurd, 16 km  Bahal, 19 km Siwani, 27  Rajgarh (Rajasthan), 31  Kairu, 53 km Hissar, 55 km Hansi, 47 km Pilani, and 58 km from Bhiwani, 165 km Delhi and 284 km from state capital Chandigarh.

Train connectivity
Nearest train stations on the Jakhal-Hisar-Sadalpur line are 7 km Jhumpa Khurd, 16 km  Bahal and 19 km Siwani, Nearest major junctions are Sadulpur-Rajgarh Railway junction 34 km, Hisar Junction railway station  and Bhiwani Junction railway station 60 km.

Airport connectivity

Geography
Bidhwan is at the altitude of 210 m or 689 feet. Bidhwan lies in the semi-arid climate of the sandy bagar tract with scattered low sand dunes. Bidhwan has water ponds for the cattle. The fields are irrigated by the isharwal-Jhumpa distributory of Siwani branch of Western Yamuna Canal.

Climate and ecology

Climate
Main ecological issues are desertification, deforestation, encroachment and land grabbing of common Panchayat forest and grazing land called "bani".

Fauna
Animals and birds of various species are found including sparrow, large Indian parakeet, parrot, crow, rat, rabbit, nilgai, pied crested cuckoo, koel, pheasant, kingfisher, bulbul and Indian magpie robin.

Notable people
 Krishna Poonia (born 5 May 1982) is an international gold-medalist Indian discus thrower, 2004, 2008 and 2012 Olympian, Padma Shri awardee, politician of Congress party and the current MLA from Sadulpur constituency in Rajasthan.

See also

 Badya Jattan
 Barwas
 Dhillon
 Kanwari

References

External links
 Google location map
 Haryana Government e-Services
 Bhiwani District Website
 e-Disha e-services
 Government of India e-services

Villages in Bhiwani district
Archaeological sites in Haryana